George Bernard Myrum (November 4, 1897 – November 12, 1938) was an American college football, basketball, and baseball player and coach. He served as the head football coach at Gustavus Adolphus College in St. Peter, Minnesota from 1926 to 1938, compiling a record of 62–20–6.

Head coaching record

Football

References

External links
 

1897 births
1938 deaths
American men's basketball players
Basketball coaches from Minnesota
Basketball players from Minnesota
Gustavus Adolphus Golden Gusties athletic directors
Gustavus Adolphus Golden Gusties baseball coaches
Gustavus Adolphus Golden Gusties football coaches
Gustavus Adolphus Golden Gusties men's basketball coaches
Minnesota Golden Gophers football players
Minnesota Golden Gophers men's basketball players
People from Worthington, Minnesota